Shorkot , , is a city in Punjab, Pakistan. 

It is also a capital city of Shorkot Tehsil in Jhang district. It is located at 30°30'N 72°24'E with an altitude of 131 metres (433 ft). 

The city is famous for the tombs of Sufis Sultan Bahoo, Darbar Hazrat Peer Syed Akbar Ali Shah Gilani, Syed Bahadur Ali Shah, Shah Mehmood Ghazi (also known as "Ghazi Pir") and Syed Mehboob Alam Shah Gillani. The tomb of Gillani is in the centre of the town. He was born in Emperor Jahangir's era and died in 1079 (Hijri), during the rule of Emperor Aurangzeb. Aurangzeb came to see him at shorkot, and after a meeting became his disciple and granted vast tract of land around Shorkot to the family of Syed Mehboob Alam Gillani. Later Emperor Shah Alam II built a tomb for PIr Mehboob Aalam Gillani which is a great symbol of Mughal architecture and still exists in the centre of the city.

Ancient History 
V. S. Agrawala writes that Ashtadhyayi of Panini mentions janapada Uśīnara (उशीनर) (IV.2.118) - Panini mentions Ushinara as part of Vahika. Panini mentions three divisions of Vahika Country, viz Kekaya, Uśīnara and Madra. Fourth division to be added to Vahika country is Śavasa. Of these Kekaya and Śavasa may be located between Jhelum and Chenab rivers, the first in the south and the second in the north respectively; Madra and Ushinara between the Chenab and Ravi River in the north and south respectively.

The Divyadana refers to the Shvasas in Uttarapatha with headquarters at Takshasila to which Ashoka was deputed by his father Bindusara as Viceroy to quell their rebellion. The name of Savasa or Shvasa seems to be preserved in the modern name Chhiba, comprising Punchh, Rajauri and Bhimbhara. In literature Ushinaras are often associated with the Śibis (greek - Siboi) whose chief town Śibipura has been identified with Shorkot in Jhang district.

V. S. Agrawala writes that Panini mentions Pura (IV.2.122) ending names of towns like Arishṭapura (Pali: Ariṭṭapura), a city in the kingdom of Shivi in Vahika. V. K. Mathur[4] tells us the location of Shivirashtra, the kingdom of king Shivi, at Shorkot in Jhang district of Pakistan.

Professor B.S. Dhillon writes that the ancient city of Sibipura or Shivipura which means the city of Shivi is today called "Shorkot" and is located in the Jhang district of Punjab, Pakistan. As per Diodorus, Arrian and Strabo, the area surrounding Sibipura was occupied by a people called Sibi, during the time of Alexander's invasion of Punjab.

Professor Eggermont  said, "J. Ph. Vogel showed that the mound of Shorkot (Jhang district, between Chenab, Indus, and Ravi rivers) represents the site of Sibipura, the town (pura) of the Sibis, which is mentioned in a Shorkot inscription". Even today Sibi or Sibia is a well known Jat clan in Punjab. Furthermore, Professor Eggermont said, "However, I cannot possibly pass over in silence that in the very Vessantara Jataka the town over which Sanjaya, king of Sibi, ruled is called Jettuttara and not Aritta-pura. It is probably more likely the word Jetuttara is Jetupura or Jatupura which means the place where Jats live. The word "pura" in Sanskrit means "city".

Notable people 
 Muhammad Arif Khan Rajbana Sial
 Sahibzada Nazir Sultan

References

Populated places in Jhang District